Portrait of Floris Soop or The Standard Bearer is a 1654 oil on canvas portrait by Rembrandt, now in the Metropolitan Museum of Art, New York.

The flag, the plume in the hat, and the tooled leather baldric (sword-belt worn over shoulder) indicate that the subject is an ensign in one of Amsterdam's civic guard companies.  He is almost certainly Floris Soop, a wealthy bachelor who owned some 140 paintings.

The work is currently (2018) not on view.

Sources
http://www.metmuseum.org/collection/the-collection-online/search/437395

Soop
Soop
Soop
1654 paintings
Paintings in the collection of the Metropolitan Museum of Art